A... For Assassin is a 1966 Italian mystery film directed by Angelo Dorigo and starring Alan Steel and Mary Arden.

Plot
A wealthy diamond mine owner gets killed, and his relatives (who all hate each other) gather in the family villa for the reading of the will. They are told they must spend an entire month living together in the villa, during which time they will be eliminated down to only three heirs. An aging Scotland Yard detective is present to resolve the first crime that set this whole chain of events into motion. One by one, the relatives are eliminated until there is only one left.

Cast

Gilberto Mazzi as Inspector Matt
Roland Redman as Sgt. Robson
Barbara Penn as Mary
Aldo Rendine as Jackson
Franco Pesce as Peter
Ivano Staccioli as George

Production
A... For Assassin was shot at Balsorano castle in April 1966. The film is allegedly based on a story by Ernesto Gastaldi. The title refers to a dagger with the letter "A" carved on it, which plays an important part in the mystery.

References

Sources

External links

Italian mystery films
1960s mystery films
Italian black-and-white films
1960s Italian films